Los Pasteles Verdes was a Latin pop group most popular in the 1970s. They originated in Chimbote, Peru, but performed for many years in Mexico.

History
Los Pasteles Verdes was founded by guitarist Víctor Hugo Acuña and keyboardist Cesar Acuña, who are brothers; they had previously played together in The Jeekstones and Los Benkers. In 1973 they formed Los Pasteles Verdes with Singers: Aldo Guibovich, German Laos, drummer Jorge Luis Principe, bassist Miguel Moreno, and percussionist Juan Vásquez. Their first hit, a success across Latin America, was "Angelitos Negros", which preceded the release of their debut Recuerdos de Una Noche. Among their later hits were "Hipocresia" and "Esclavo y Amo".

The group made a significant impact on the Mexican and Mexican-American musical markets in the late 1970s. For part of the 1970s and 1980s they were based out of Mexico. They toured Japan in 2007.

Members
Current
Hugo Acuña
Dubbie Acuña
Richie Acuña
Kike Gamez
Victor Hugo Acuña Jr.

Former
German Laos
Luis Alberto Rios
César Acuña
Tommy Lamas
Tito Cerna
Jorge Luis Príncipe
Miguel Moreno
Juan Vasquez
Adan Zavaleta
Guillermo Araujo
Raul Padilla
Aldo Guibovich
Fernando Arias
Linker Sanchez

References

External links

Peruvian musical groups
Musical groups established in 1973
1973 establishments in Peru